"I Wanna" is the first single from French music producer and DJ Bob Sinclar's studio album, Made in Jamaïca, released in 2010. It features Balkan duo Sahara (consisted of Bulgarian singer Andrea and Romanian producer Costi Ioniță) and Jamaican musician Shaggy.

Track listings and format
Promo - CD-single Yellow / N.E.W.S.
 I Wanna (Radio Edit) - 3:18
 I Wanna (Reggae Version) - 3:17
			
The Remixes - 12" maxi D:vision DV 694
 I Wanna (Michel Calfan Remix) - 7:13
 I Wanna (Ludovic Ross, Xavier Maldini & Sylvain Armand Remix) - 7:17
			
CD-single Yellow / N.E.W.S. 541416503596 [be] / EAN 5414165035961
 I Wanna (Radio Edit) - 3:19
 I Wanna (Reggae Version) - 3:17
 I Wanna (Extended Mix) - 5:24
 I Wanna (Michael Calfan Remix) - 7:13

CD, Maxi-single 8-track - D vision Records – DV 694.10 CDS
  I Wanna (Radio Edit) [3:18]	
  I Wanna (Lorenzo Di Grasso & Romain Pelletti Radio Mix) [3:18]	
  I Wanna (Extended Mix) [5:23]	
  I Wanna (Michael Calfan Remix) [7:13]	
  I Wanna (Sylvain Armand Remix) [8:02]	
  I Wanna (Lorenzo Di Grasso & Romain Pelletti Club Remix) [6:16]	
  I Wanna (Ludovic Ross, Xavier Maldini & Sylvain Armand Remix) [7:16]	
  I Wanna (Maxime Torres Vs. Klm Trip Remix) [5:50]

Charts

References

Bob Sinclar songs
2010 singles
2010 songs
Ministry of Sound singles
Reggae fusion songs
Songs written by Shaggy (musician)
Songs written by Bob Sinclar
Songs written by Costi Ioniță